Dzmitry Kamyshyk (born 5 May 1990) is a Belarusian handball player for SKA Minsk and the Belarusian national team.

References

1990 births
Living people
Belarusian male handball players
Sportspeople from Minsk